Andaman Creole Hindi is a trade language of the Andaman Islands, spoken as a native language especially in Port Blair and villages to the south. Singh (1994) describes it as a creolization of Hindustani, Bengali and Tamil.

References

Languages of India
Hindustani language
Languages of the Andaman and Nicobar Islands
Hindustani-based pidgins and creoles